Gabriela Deleuze Ducasa (born c. 1965) born Distrito Federal, México (México), is a Mexican-Panamanian beauty pageant contestant winner of the Miss Panamá 1987 title. Also represented Panama in Miss Universe 1987, the 36th Miss Universe pageant was held at Hall Four at World Trade Centre, Singapore on May 27, 1987. She was 28th Score in the Preliminary Swimsuit with 7.270 

She represented Los Santos state.

Also represented Panamá in the Reinado Internacional del Café in 1988.

References

External links
 Miss Panamá  official website

1960s births
Living people
Miss Universe 1987 contestants
Panamanian beauty pageant winners
Señorita Panamá